Twierdzielewo  is a village in the administrative district of Gmina Przytoczna, within Międzyrzecz County, Lubusz Voivodeship, in western Poland.

Demographics (2011 census)

References

Twierdzielewo